The Blonde Nightingale is a 1930 German musical film directed by Johannes Meyer and starring Ernst Behmer, Else Elster and Erich Kestin.

The film's sets were designed by the art director Willi Herrmann.

Cast

References

Bibliography

External links

1930 films
Films of the Weimar Republic
German musical films
1930s German-language films
Films directed by Johannes Meyer
Films set in Berlin
Films about singers
UFA GmbH films
German black-and-white films
1930 musical films
1930s German films